Roberto FE Soto is a Cuban-American communicator and educator who specializes in academia and media, startups, as well as turnaround projects. Soto has produced for various major organizations, including The Washington Post and NBC News. During his management career in 1987, he became the first and the youngest executive at Televisa-owned Univision. Soto has written and produced award-winning broadcasts and documentaries in Spanish as well as in English. Before starting his teaching and global media consulting career, he served as NY Bureau Chief for Associated Press TV. Soto publishes Dose of News , CITY IMAGES and has been a guest commentator on popular media programs. Soto holds advanced communication degrees and has received multiple awards, including 100 Influential Hispanics in America, Columbia University Journalism Dupont, and EMMY Awards. Soto’s most proud achievements are his children Natasha, Sabrina, and Yiliang, and grandkids Elena, Chloe, Sophia, Parker, and Olivia.
Professor Soto teaches online and consults for international media organizations, from his office on City Island, NYC.,  El-Barbaro-Del- https://cimages.me/content/el-barbaro-del-medio  Years of experience in journalism in a supervisory role, with a focus on multiplatform newsgathering and storytelling. Expertise in news and digital content trends and an understanding of digital behavior and emerging platforms. Solid news judgment and producing experience across a range of reporting and storytelling genres. Experience building multilingual and multicultural audiences, leading the integration of content, including local, national, and international news across platforms. Understanding of the FOIA and public records, and an appreciation for the practice of data-focused journalism. Experienced leading journalists, including team building and leading collaborative work processes, applying insights from analytics and benchmarks to content decisions on-air and online. An appreciation for a sense of place and the value of localism. Strong editorial and ethical judgment. Academic expertise and advanced degrees. https://www.ratemyprofessors.com/search/teachers?query=roberto%20soto

Early life and education
Soto was born in [[Habana, Cuba) and raised in the (USA). He earned advanced university degrees in Speech and Communications. Professor Soto publishes #CityImages https://cimages.me/  #DONews http://arts.doseofnews.com/ and a few other platforms. https://cimages.me/content/el-barbaro-del-medio

Career 
Soto started his career in Miami working for WPLGTV as an anchorman and as a  reporter for community radio stations. In the 1980s he worked as a producer for NBC, the nation's most popular TV Network. His production while in NBC included documentaries "Look Well At The Rainbow"E. Howard Hunt, "Kent State" Kent State shootings, "El Salvador" Salvadoran Civil War "The Sound That Wouldn't Die" Big band. http://cimages.me/sites/default/files/media/hear-and-now-and-second-sunday.mp3

After completing his degrees, there was a labor strike at NBC, and Soto moved to Los Angeles, California with his wife Maria and daughters Natasha and Sabrina, where he served as an Executive Producer at Univision TV Network and News Director for Telemundo TV Station Group, from 1987–1997, when he also established USIA-TV Marti for former President George Bush, among other media organizations of considerable relevance. Soto has lectured in Spanish and in English at many universities. He has also shared credits with Halle Berry and Warren Beatty. Soto is frequently invited to comment on TMZ and in panels and international media. Currently, he works in New York as Executive Director of IMAGINUS and has served as a frequent distinguished lecturer at ASU, CUNY, Marist, TOURO, FDU, CNR, IONA, NYIT, FDU, Trine, and other institutions of higher learning. He also manages several blogs and successful websites.

Throughout his distinguished career, Roberto Soto helped launch NBCNews' The Source and Overnight, Univision Noticias, Noticiero Telemundo, USIA-TV, News12 New York's First Regional Network, Associated Press Television News, Imaginus, City Images, Dose of News.

Awards 

Roberto FE Soto has been the recipient of several prestigious awards prizes and has served as a Gatekeeper and Juror for NY Press Club and International EMMY Awards. In 1985 he and his colleagues working on NBC News Overnight was recognized by the jurors of the duPont Columbia Awards as "the best written and most intelligent news program ever."[1] They received the Alfred I DuPont prestigious journalism prize from Columbia University J School and shared the award with 60 Minutes correspondents. 
He then went to  The Today Show. and other highly rated and award-winning programs. In Spanish-speaking newsrooms, Journalists working in newsrooms under his directions have won multiple AP and EMMY Awards. Soto was honored to be on HISPANIC BUSINESS' first list of 100 Influential leaders in America.

The veteran journalist is the founding executive producer of The Source, Noticiero Univision, Director of News Telemundo Stations, Division Chief USIA TV, Station Manager News 12, The Bronx, Associated Press Television News and serves as a media consultant and educator.

Soto continues to stress that his greatest blessing and personal achievement has been his children and grandkids. From his oldest to his youngest, they are... Natasha, Sabrina, Yiliang, Elena, Chloe, Sophia, Parker, and Olivia.

References 
1. Soto, Roberto. Professor in the Communication department at Albany State University, Albany, GA.  Retrieved May 6, 2015

2. Soto, Roberto. Look Well At The Rainbow. Bay of Pigs Invasion of Cuba Retrieved May 6, 2015.

3. Soto, Roberto. Kent State. 4 Students Dead in Ohio Retrieved May 6, 2015.

4. Soto, Roberto. El Salvador. Civil War in Central America Retrieved May 6, 2015.

5. Soto, Roberto. The Sound That Wouldn't Die. The Swing Music Era Retrieved May 6, 2015.

6. Sanchez, Kirsten. "City Island building landmarked.". Bronx Times, 2012. Retrieved May 6, 2015.

7. Rocchio, Patrick. "City Island journalist starts online newspaper." Bronx Times, 2011. Retrieved May 6, 2015.

1960 births
Living people